The 1999 World Table Tennis Championships men's doubles was the 45th edition of the men's doubles championship.

Kong Linghui and Liu Guoliang won the title after defeating Wang Liqin and Yan Sen in the final by three sets to two.

Results

See also
List of World Table Tennis Championships medalists

References

-